Notting Dale is a mainly residential enclave in the West London district of Notting Hill. It has variously been associated with Irish, Catholic and Gypsy populations.

It forms an electoral ward of the local authority, the Royal Borough of Kensington and Chelsea.

The site was formerly agricultural land belonging to two farms, Notting Barns and Portobello, together covering . The area then went through several industrial stages, such as pottery, before becoming overrun with pig farming and other "noxious" trades, all of whom were required to move out from their former inner city locations. This gave rise to area's nickname of "The Pigs and the Potteries". The area became known for appalling living conditions; in the mid-19th century, it fell into disuse and disrepair.  By the late 19th century Notting Dale began to be developed for residential purposes, and also became known for its Irish Gypsy community. It is now home to a mix of public and private housing.

References

Notting Hill
Districts of the Royal Borough of Kensington and Chelsea